Hildesheim is an electoral constituency (German: Wahlkreis) represented in the Bundestag. It elects one member via first-past-the-post voting. Under the current constituency numbering system, it is designated as constituency 48. It is located in southern Lower Saxony, comprising the district of Hildesheim.

Hildesheim was created for the inaugural 1949 federal election. Since 2017, it has been represented by Bernd Westphal of the Social Democratic Party (SPD).

Geography
Hildesheim is located in southern Lower Saxony. As of the 2021 federal election, it comprises the district of Hildesheim.

History
Hildesheim was created in 1949, then known as Hildesheim-Stadt und -Land. It acquired its current name in the 1965 election. In the inaugural Bundestag election, it was Lower Saxony constituency 26 in the numbering system. From 1953 through 1961, it was number 48. From 1965 through 1998, it was number 43. In the 2002 and 2005 elections, it was number 48. In the 2009 election, it was number 49. Since the 2013 election, it has been number 48.

Originally, the constituency comprised the independent city of Hildesheim and the district of Hildesheim-Marienburg. In the 1976 election, it compromised the district of Hildesheim without the municipality of Nordstemmen. Since the 1980 election, it has comprised the entirety of the district of Hildesheim.

Members
The constituency was first held by Heinrich-Wilhelm Ruhnke of the Social Democratic Party (SPD), who served from 1949 to 1953. Adolf Cillien of the Christian Democratic Union (CDU) won it in 1953 and served a single term. He was succeeded by fellow CDU member Theodor Oberländer, who also served a single term. Friedrich Kühn of the CDU was elected in 1961 and re-elected in 1965. Joachim Raffert regained the constituency for the SPD in 1969. In 1972, he was succeeded by Hermann Rappe. He served until 1998, when fellow SPD member Bernhard Brinkmann was elected. He served four terms as representative. In 2013, Ute Bertram of the CDU was elected. In 2017, Bernd Westphal regained the constituency for the SPD.

Election results

2021 election

2017 election

2013 election

2009 election

References

Federal electoral districts in Lower Saxony
1949 establishments in Germany
Constituencies established in 1949
Hildesheim (district)